Air America is an American action/adventure television series starring Lorenzo Lamas, which premiered on October 3, 1998. The series is not based on the 1990 film Air America. A hangar just west of the Camarillo Airport Tower in Camarillo, California, was used as a set during filming, although it has since been replaced with newer buildings.

Plot
The series concerns two undercover secret agents, Rio and Wiley, who assume a new role for the State Department as pilots who work for the Latin America airline Air America. They receive direct orders from the State Department to do various missions such as protecting witnesses, investigating international crime, and rescuing those in need.

Cast

Episodes

Home media
On June 6, 2006, Sony Pictures Home Entertainment released Air America: The Complete Series on DVD in Region 1.

References

External links
Air America @ pearsontv.com

1998 American television series debuts
1999 American television series endings
Television series by Sony Pictures Television
First-run syndicated television programs in the United States
Aviation television series
American action television series
American action adventure television series